North American Cuisine includes foods native to or popular in countries of North America, such as Canadian cuisine, American cuisine, African American cuisine, Mexican cuisine, Caribbean cuisine and Central American cuisine. North American cuisines display influence from many international cuisines, including Native American cuisine, Jewish cuisine, African cuisine, Asian cuisine, and especially European cuisine.

As a broad, geo-culinary term, North American cuisine also includes Central American and Caribbean cuisines.  These regions are part of North America, so these regional cuisines also fall within the penumbra of North American cookery.

The term "regional" is somewhat ambiguous, however, since the cuisine of Puerto Rico can differ markedly from Cuban cuisine; Mexican cuisine spills across the border into the Tex-Mex and Mexi-Cali "sub-cuisines"; and the cuisines of Michigan and Ontario have more in common with each other than either has with the cuisines of Manitoba or Iowa.

North American cuisine can also include dishes and cuisines that originated in North America such as the Canadian poutine and regional cuisines like California cuisine.

History

North American cuisine first originated.

Countries
 American cuisine
 Anguillan cuisine
 Antigua and Barbuda cuisine
 Bahamian cuisine
 Barbadian cuisine
 Belizean cuisine
 Bermudian cuisine
 British Virgin Islands cuisine
 Canadian cuisine
 Caymanian cuisine
 Costa Rican cuisine
 Cuban cuisine
 Dominica cuisine
 Dominican Republic cuisine
 Greenlandic cuisine
 Grenadan cuisine
 Guatemalan cuisine
 Haitian cuisine
 Honduran cuisine
 Jamaican cuisine
 Mexican cuisine
 Montserratian cuisine
 Nicaraguan cuisine
 Panamanian cuisine
 Puerto Rican cuisine
 Saint Barthélemy cuisine
 Saint Lucian cuisine
 Salvadoran cuisine
 Trinidadian and Tobagonian cuisine
 United States Virgin Islands cuisine

See also

List of American regional and fusion cuisines
Mesoamerican cuisine
Caribbean cuisine

References

 
Cuisine by continent